Baadj (also known as El Baadj) is a village in the commune of Oum Touyour, in El M'Ghair District, El Oued Province, Algeria. The village is located on the W31 regional road just northwest of where it meets the N3 highway, near Oum Touyour.  south of Djamaa.

References

Neighbouring towns and cities

Populated places in El Oued Province